John Bridgewater was an English clerical historian of the Catholic Confessors under Queen Elizabeth I.

Biography
He was born in Yorkshire about 1532; died probably at Trier, about 1596. He proceeded M. A. at Oxford University in 1556, was ordained priest, and in 1563 became Rector of Lincoln College in that university. He also held several other important preferments all of which he resigned in 1574, when with several of his students he crossed over to Douai, preferring "the old form of religion" to the novelties of those whom he styled "Calvinopapists and Puritans". 

He probably never returned to England but lived at various Catholic places on the European continent (Reims, Paris, Rome, Trier); in 1588 and 1594 he resided at Trier. Ribadaneira, with Father Southwell and Brother Foley account him a member of the Society of Jesus, though there is no proof of that (Records of English Catholics, I, pg 408).

Writings
Bridgewater  refuted (Trier 1589) a Protestant work on the pope as Antichrist and also wrote  "Account of the Six Articles usually Proposed to the Missioners that Suffered in England", and against which he voted in 1562.  

He may be best known as the earliest martyrologist of Catholic England. His work, conceived in the spirit of Eusebius as a triumphant apology for Catholicism, is entitled Concertatio Ecclesliae Catholicae in Angliâ adversus Calvinopapistas et Puritanos sub Elizabethâ Reginâ quorundam hominum doctrina et sanctitate illustrium renovata et recognita, etc., i.e. The Battle of the Catholic Faith in England under Queen Elizabeth, renewed in the lives of certain men illustrious for learning and sanctity, among them more than one hundred martyrs, and a very great number of others distinguished for their (religious) deeds and sufferings; confirmed also by the retractations of apostates, by new edicts of the persecutors, and by the writings of very learned Catholics against the Anglican, or rather female, pontificate, and in defense of the authority of the Roman pontiff over Christian princes (Trier, 1588, about 850 pp. in octavo).
 
Another edition was brought out (ibid.) by Cardinal Allen in 1594; it served thenceforth as an original record of English Catholic sufferings for the Faith and Dodd, Challoner and  Lingard used extensively its reliable biographical and historical data. Its rather miscellaneous contents are described in the Chetham Society's Remains (XLVIII, 47-50).

References

Sources

1530s births
1590s deaths
16th-century English historians
16th-century English Anglican priests
16th-century English Roman Catholic priests
Clergy from Yorkshire
Anglican priest converts to Roman Catholicism
Fellows of Lincoln College, Oxford
English male non-fiction writers